Macario de Souza (born 14 June 1983), sometimes known artistically as Kid Mac, is an Australian filmmaker.

Early life
Macario is the youngest of the three children of Macario Snr and Maria de Souza, who immigrated from Minas Gerais, Brazil, in the mid-1970s and settled in Sydney, Australia. His parents provided a traditional Brazilian influence in Macario's and his two sisters, Glenda and Ingrid's lives growing up. After attending Matraville public primary school, Macario went on to complete his HSC at South Sydney High School, graduating as school captain.

During his time at high school, de Souza explored music and film projects. "I was always in and out of punk rock bands in school but it wasn't until the Bra Boys film that I got the chance to professionally record my music".
De Souza was in the minority of his circle of friends, as he applied for and was accepted into university. "Maroubra is a party town. It is very easy to fall in that trap. I put in the hard yards at a crucial period through my teens. While everyone else was on the drink and on benders every weekend, I was putting in the work.”

Macario went on to study film and music production in a bachelor of fine arts degree, majoring in time-based art at UNSW Art & Design.

Career
Since graduating university, de Souza has produced two short films, Ours and The Hard Way, the feature-length documentary Bra Boys: Blood is Thicker than Water, two eight-episode seasons of the reality television show Football Superstar for Foxtel, and a six-part documentary called South Side Story featuring Russell Crowe and the battle for the Rabbitohs football club.

Macario's first feature film, Bra Boys: Blood is Thicker than Water, was shot locally in and around Maroubra and edited in his family's apartment near Maroubra beach. It is presented as a documentary encompassing the lifestyle and ideals of the "Bra Boys" brotherhood. It portrays members of the Bra Boys reflecting on both the benefits and difficulties of growing up in Maroubra. Narrated by actor Russell Crowe, Bra Boys features three of Macario's original compositions in the soundtrack, which were written and recorded for the film.

In 2011 de Souza completed shooting his second feature-length film, Fighting Fear. The film features his two best friends and fellow Bra Boy members that he grew up with, big wave surfer Mark Matthews and Mixed Martial Arts champion Richie Vaculik. De Souza describes the film as "a story of friendship and redemption".

Music
After Bra Boys, de Souza began building his brand, marketing himself with his music under the name of Kid Mac. He has collaborated musically and toured with these Australian and international recording artists:

 Mat McHugh and The Beautiful Girls (Aus)
 Mickey Avalon (USA)
 Marcello D2 (Brazil)
 Bliss N Eso (Aus)
 The Game (USA)
 Natiruts (Brazil)
 WU-TANG (USA)
 Lil John (USA)
 Dirt Nasty (USA)

De Souza remains an ambassador for the education of youth about the dangers of drug and alcohol abuse. In September 2011, De Souza, Vaculik and Mathews featured on the ABC'S show Australian Story. The episode depicted the three friends recounting their experiences with alcohol-related incidents as teenagers and the lifelong consequences that can ensue from that pattern of behaviour. In February, De Souza became an ambassador for Feb Fast 2012, an organisation that raises money for alcohol problem awareness.

Discography 
De Souza released his first CD in April 2012.

The single Higher from the album Head Noise was released on October 18 2013;

The single Good Life was released on October 16 2020.

Filmography

Awards and nominations

ARIA Music Awards
The ARIA Music Awards is an annual awards ceremony that recognises excellence, innovation, and achievement across all genres of the music of Australia. Fanning has won five awards.

! 
|-
| 2022
| "Wish You Well " (Baker Boy featuring Bernard Fanning) (dir. Macario de Souza)
| ARIA Award for Best Video
| 
| 
|-

References

External links
 

1983 births
Living people
Australian film directors
Australian film producers
Australian screenwriters
English-language film directors
People from the Eastern Suburbs (Sydney)
Australian surfers
Australian documentary filmmakers
Australian experimental filmmakers
Musicians from Sydney
Australian people of Brazilian descent
Participants in Australian reality television series
21st-century Australian singers
Australian indie rock musicians